Newlands is a suburb of Pretoria, South Africa.  It is located in the province of Gauteng.

See also
Newlands, a suburb of Cape Town
Newlands, a suburb of Johannesburg

References

Suburbs of Pretoria